Květa Peschke and Katarina Srebotnik were the defending champion, but they withdrew in the quarterfinals before their match against Natalie Grandin and Vladimíra Uhlířová.

Chuang Chia-jung and Olga Govortsova won the tournament. They defeated Italian pair Sara Errani and Roberta Vinci in the final, 7–5, 6–2.

Seeds

Draw

Draw

References
 Main Draw

New Haven Open at Yale - Doubles
Doubles